Acanthocereus tetragonus, is a species of cactus that is native to Florida and the Lower Rio Grande Valley of Texas in the United States, Mexico, Central America, the Caribbean, and northern South America. The species is invasive in New Caledonia. Common names include night-blooming cereus, barbed-wire cactus, sword-pear, dildo cactus, triangle cactus, and Órgano-alado de pitaya (Spanish). The miniature cultivar is known as fairy castle cactus. It was originally described by Carl Linnaeus in 1753 as Cactus tetragonus but was moved to the genus Acanthocereus in 1938 by Pieter Wagenaar Hummelinck.

Description
Outer tepals are greenish-white, inner tepals are pure white, and pistils are creamy white. Flowers are open from midnight until dawn, attracting hummingbird moths (Hemaris spp.).

This highly spiny, often large, and thicket-forming cactus has stems up to 10 feet or possibly taller. It is native to the coastal hammocks and hot, dry coastal habitats and thickets and sandy coastal habitats of central and southern Florida and the Keys, south into the Caribbean. The flowers are showy and are white with a deep red and orange or red-orange center. The flowers bloom at night and close during the day. This cactus blooms a few times a year for several weeks at a time. This cactus often forms thickets in coastal hammocks which can be impenetrable and spiny.

Cultivars

The Fairy Castle Cactus, also known as Fairytale Castle Cactus is a miniature cultivar of this species. It has many curved branches that resemble the turrets of a castle.

Uses
Young stems of the barbed-wire cactus can be eaten as a vegetable either cooked or raw, while the fruits are edible and sweet. It is sometimes cultivated as an ornamental outdoors. It is sometimes planted as a living fence. 

The miniature cultivar of this species, Fairy Castle Cactus, is commonly grown as an houseplant for their small size and interesting shape.

References

External links

Hylocereeae
Cacti of North America
Cacti of South America
Flora of the Caribbean
Flora of Central America
Night-blooming plants
Flora of Florida
Flora of the Rio Grande valleys
Flora of Venezuela
Plants described in 1938